The Tumleren class was a class of three torpedo boats built for the Royal Danish Navy. The last of the three torpedo boats was retired from active service in 1930, and the three ships were sold for scrap in 1935.

Construction and design
In 1908, the Royal Danish Navy decided to acquire several torpedo boats, with two of the world's leading torpedo boat specialists, the German shipyard Schichau-Werke and the British shipyard Yarrows, each contracted to design and build a prototype torpedo boat, with two more torpedo boats of each design to be built under license in Danish shipyards.

Displacement was  full load. Two coal-fed boilers supplied steam for two Schichau direct-drive steam turbines, which drove two propeller shafts.

The ships carried five  torpedo tubes, with one in the bow and the remaining four in single swivelling mounts fore and aft on the ships' beam. Two 75 mm L/30 guns were carried fore and aft on the ships' centreline, with a single  machine gun completing the armament. Crew was 35 officers and other ranks.

Service
The three Tumleren-class ships were considered more advanced than the Yarrow designed s, although the Söridderen class, which had higher freeboard, were more seaworthy. They served through the First World War on neutrality patrols. Tumleren and Spækhuggeren were retired to the reserves in 1929, with Vindhunden following in 1930. All three ships were sold for scrap in 1935.

Ships

Citations

References
 
 

Torpedo boats of the Royal Danish Navy
Torpedo boat classes